Reed is a small village and civil parish in North Hertfordshire. The Prime Meridian passes just to the east of the village, between Reed and Barkway. The modern A10 road (here following the course of the Roman Ermine Street) passes just to the west of the village. The population of the parish was 310 at the time of the 2011 census.

Reed has a first school, and following a short inspection on 23 March 2017, the judgement of Ofsted was that the school continues to be ‘good’. There is also a village hall, the Saxon parish church of St. Mary, a small chapel (now closed and in private ownership), a cricket club, and a village pub and restaurant set in a 16th-century coaching inn which is currently closed pending planning applications. A converted windmill also stands in the village.

There has reportedly been a settlement at Reed for 2,000 years, and the community was mentioned in the Domesday Book of 1086 (as Retth). A number of houses in the village have the remnants of ancient moats, and the village includes a number of ancient woods on its outskirts. Reed was awarded protected status as a conservation area in 1974.

Governance
Reed has three tiers of local government at parish, district and county level: Reed Parish Council, North Hertfordshire District Council, and Hertfordshire County Council.

Reed is an ancient parish, and it was part of the hundred of Odsey. Reed was included in the Royston Poor Law Union from 1835. The Local Government Act 1894 created parish and district councils. Reed was included in Ashwell Rural District from 28 December 1894. Despite the name, Ashwell Rural District Council was based in the town of Royston. Ashwell Rural District was abolished in 1935, becoming part of Hitchin Rural District, which in turn was abolished in 1974, becoming part of North Hertfordshire.

References

External links

Reed Parish Council
Reed First School
Save the Cabinet

Villages in Hertfordshire
Civil parishes in Hertfordshire